Nälkämaan laulu (meaning "the song of the hunger country") is a Finnish poem by Ilmari Kianto. It was turned into a song by Oskar Merikanto.

The poem is a traditional poem from the region of Kainuu. Its lyrics describe the natural beauty of Kainuu, the hard-working nature (see sisu) of the Kainuu people, and their pride of their homeland. The poem begins:

External links 
 Complete lyrics (in Finnish)

Finnish poems